John James Toffey (June 1, 1844 – March 13, 1911) was a United States Union Army officer during the American Civil War who received the Medal of Honor.

Civil War
Serving first as a Private in Company C, 21st New Jersey Volunteer Infantry (a nine-month service regiment) from August 28, 1862 to June 19, 1863, he was commissioned as a First Lieutenant in Company F, 33rd New Jersey Volunteer Infantry on August 23, 1863, and was mustered into the unit on August 29, 1863. He participated in the November 23, 1863 Battle of Missionary Ridge, at Chattanooga, Tennessee, and it was there that he performed the act of bravery that garnered him the Medal of Honor.

His wounds forced his discharge from the 33rd New Jersey on June 2, 1864, and he was appointed into the Veteran Reserve Corps. He served in the VRC as a lieutenant until June 1866. While still in service, he was an eyewitness to Lincoln's assassination at Ford's Theater, participated in the search for the conspirators, testified at their trial, and witnessed their subsequent execution.

He received his medal on September 10, 1897.

Post-War Career
After the war he went on to have a life of extensive public service in Hudson County, New Jersey. He served two terms as Hudson County sheriff, served as state treasurer of New Jersey from 1875 to 1891, as an alderman of Jersey City, New Jersey, and was elected as a member of the New Jersey State Legislature.

He died in Pawling, New York, the town of his birth, and was buried in the Pawling Cemetery, near the grave of Civil War Naval hero Rear Admiral John Lorimer Worden, his uncle by marriage of Worden to his father's sister Olive. His grave was marked with a Medal of Honor headstone in 2004, 93 years after his death.

Medal of Honor citation
Rank and organization: First Lieutenant, Company G, 33d New Jersey Infantry. Place and date. At Chattanooga, Tenn., November 23, 1863. Entered service at: Hudson, N.J. Birth: Duchess, N.Y. Date of issue: September 10, 1897.

Citation:

Although excused from duty on account of sickness, went to the front in command of a storming party and with conspicuous gallantry participated in the assault of Missionary Ridge; was here wounded and permanently disabled.

See also

List of American Civil War Medal of Honor recipients: T–Z

Notes

References

Beyer, W.F., and Keydel, O.F., "Deeds of Valor: How America's Civil War Heroes Won the Congressional Medal of Honor", 1901. Republished, 2000, Smithmark Publishers.
Bilby, Joseph G. and Goble, William C., "Remember You Are Jerseymen: A Military History of Jersey's Troops in the Civil War", Longstreet House, Hightstown, June 1998. .
Lang, George, Collins, Raymond L., and White, Gerald, Medal of Honor recipients 1863-1994, 1995 
Kauffman, Michael W., "American Brutus: John Wilkes Booth and the Lincoln conspiracies", 2004 
Stryker, William S., "Record of Officers and Men of New Jersey in the Civil War 1861-1865", Trenton, New Jersey, 1876.

1844 births
1911 deaths
People of New Jersey in the American Civil War
United States Army Medal of Honor recipients
Union Army officers
American Civil War recipients of the Medal of Honor